Habroteleia salebra, is a species of wasp belonging to the family Platygastridae. It is described from Papua New Guinea and Indonesia.

Description
Female is slightly larger than male. Body length of female is about 4.28–4.90 mm, whereas male is 4.30–4.73 mm. Mesosoma and metasoma are black. Antennae scrobe smooth. Central keel absent.

References

Insects described in 2018
Scelioninae